Antônio Carlos Zago (born 18 May 1969), sometimes known as just Antônio Carlos or simply Zago, is a Brazilian professional football manager and former player.

Club career

Early career
Born in Presidente Prudente, São Paulo, also having Italian origins, Zago moved to Dourados, Mato Grosso do Sul as a teenager, and began his senior career with local side Ubiratan, as a forward and being known as Tonhão. In 1988, after finishing the Campeonato Sul-Mato-Grossense as a starter as Ubiratan finished in the second position, he agreed to join São Paulo, with five players moving in the opposite direction.

São Paulo
Upon arriving at São Paulo, Zago was known as Antônio Carlos, and was pushed back to midfielder by manager Cilinho. He was later moved further back to a libero by the reserves manager Pupo Gimenez, and made his first team debut on 25 April 1990 by starting in a 2–0 Campeonato Paulista away win over Portuguesa.

After the arrival of Telê Santana as manager, Zago established himself as a regular starter, winning two Campeonato Paulista (1991 and 1992), aside from lifting the 1991 Série A and the 1992 Copa Libertadores.

Albacete
In July 1992, Zago was transferred to La Liga side Albacete Balompié for a fee of US$ 1.650 million. However, after failing to adapt to a new country, he opted to leave in December.

Palmeiras
In December 1992, Zago was presented at Palmeiras, along with Roberto Carlos. A first-choice option, he won two consecutive Série A and two consecutive Campeonato Paulista titles with Verdão, both in 1993 and 1994.

Kashiwa Reysol
On 7 December 1995, Palmeiras agreed the transfer of Zago and teammate Edílson to Japanese club Kashiwa Reysol, for a combined fee of R$ 5 million. He was a regular starter during the 1996 season, but opted to leave due to personal reasons.

Corinthians
In April 1997, Zago returned to his home country after signing for Corinthians, for a fee of US$ 3.3 million. In August, he assaulted an Atlético Paranaense doctor, being later suspended for 40 days in September.

Roma
In January 1998, Zago moved to the Italian capital to join Roma for a fee of US$ 4 million, at the request of the club's manager Zdenek Zeman, who was looking to reinforce the team's defensive line. In his Serie A debut with the club, on 11 February 1998 at Lecce, he was sent off after only a few minutes of play; his performances with the giallorossi soon improved, however, and he was able to demonstrate his quality and skill, leading to him being recalled to the Brazilian national side in 1999. Zago played for five seasons with Roma, and was also part of the 2001 Scudetto-winning team; Zago partnered with compatriot Aldair and Argentine Walter Samuel to form a sold back-line, which aided Roma in claiming the Serie A title. Due to his success and performances with Roma, Zago still remains a popular figure with the romanista fans, who nicknamed him Terminator during his time at the club.

In November 1999 Zago was the protagonist of a shocking episode, when he spat on Lazio player Diego Simeone's face during a derby match. The outcome was a positive attitude towards him by the fans, who paid tribute to his action in the song "Brusco", the phrases "Zago: spits fire as a dragon" and "people can only keep their mouth shut, otherwise AC Zago will spit at them". Zago is also one of the few Brazilian players who is known with his name and surname. During the years he spent to Rome he had chosen his name on the shirt to be written in different ways, the first "ANTÔNIO CARLOS", then "AC ZAGO" then simply "ZAGO."

Beşiktaş
In 2002, after nearly joining Bolton Wanderers, Zago left Roma. In May, he went to Turkey and signed with Beşiktaş for two years.

Santos
On 6 August 2004, Zago returned to Brazil and signed a contract with Santos. He only featured sparingly for the club, and left in March 2005 after playing just nine matches.

Juventude
On 6 April 2005, Zago joined Juventude on a deal until the end of the year. In March 2006, he was suspended for 60 days after being accused of racism in a Campeonato Gaúcho match against Grêmio.

Return to Santos
On 29 December 2006, Zago returned to Santos, reuniting with manager Vanderlei Luxemburgo. He retired in November 2007, aged 38.

International career
Zago debuted with the Brazil national team on 30 October 1991, in a 3–1 win against Yugoslavia, and remained within the national squad until 1993. After a period of mixed success at club level, however, he has no longer called up to the national side; only after moving to Roma, did he manage return to the national team with his stand-out performances for the club. Between 1998 and 2001, he collected 26 caps for Brazil and scored two goals; he was also part of the squad that won the 1999 Copa América. In total, he made 37 appearances for Brazil between 1991 and 2001, scoring three goals.

Managerial career
Shortly after retiring, Zago returned to Corinthians as a technical director. He resigned from the role in March 2009, after controversies regarding the signing of Ronaldo.

São Caetano
On 2 June 2009, Zago was appointed manager of São Caetano in the Série B, replacing Sérgio Soares. He missed eight matches between September and October after serving a 45-day suspension, and renewed his contract for the following season on 8 November, as his side subsequently finished seventh.

Zago's side started the 2010 Campeonato Paulista with two wins in three matches, and defeated his former side Palmeiras 4–1 at Parque Antártica on 17 February. Two days later, he left the club after accepting an offer from Palmeiras.

Palmeiras

On 19 February 2010, Palmeiras announced Zago as their new manager. He made his debut at the club two days later, in a 2–0 home win over another side he represented as a player, São Paulo.

However, Palmeiras ended the 2010 Paulista with five winless matches under Zago, and after an alleged fight with player Robert, he was dismissed on 18 May.

Local teams and assistant periods
After leaving Palmeiras, Zago took over fellow top tier side Grêmio Prudente on 17 August 2010. On 10 September, after only one win in six matches and with the club in the relegation zone, he was sacked.

On 3 January 2011, Zago was named manager of Mogi Mirim, but left on 9 February to manage Vila Nova. He was dismissed by the latter on 25 March, after just seven matches, and was announced as manager of Audax São Paulo on 23 November.

On 27 December 2012, Zago left Audax to return to Roma, now as an assistant coach of Zdeněk Zeman. On 16 October 2013, he was appointed by FC Shakhtar Donetsk as their new assistant manager, joining his former Beşiktaş coach Mircea Lucescu.

Juventude
In August 2015, Zago returned to Brazil after being named at the helm of Juventude. He finished second in the 2016 Campeonato Gaúcho with the club, knocking out Grêmio in the semifinals, and also achieved promotion in the 2016 Série C.

On 11 December 2016, Zago announced his departure from Ju.

Internacional
On 12 December 2016, Zago was appointed as the new head coach of Internacional, replacing Lisca, who was sacked on 11 December, only hours after the team were relegated for the first time in Brazilian history. On 28 May 2017, he was dismissed.

Fortaleza
On 20 August 2017, Zago was announced the new coach of Fortaleza. He helped the side return to Série B after an eight-year absence, but announced his departure on 26 October.

Juventude return
On 26 October 2017, shortly after achieving promotion with Fortaleza, Juventude announced the return of Zago as their manager. He was sacked on 22 February, after being eliminated in the Copa do Brasil.

Red Bull Brasil / Bragantino
On 5 September 2018, Zago was appointed manager of Red Bull Brasil for the 2019 Campeonato Paulista. Ahead of the 2019 Série B, as Bragantino was bought by Red Bull, he became their manager, and led the side to promotion as champions.

Kashima Antlers
On 2 January 2020, Zago was announced as manager of Kashima Antlers. He was sacked on 14 April 2021, after a poor run of form.

Bolívar
On 14 July 2021, Zago was announced as manager of Club Bolívar, months after the club was announced as partner of the City Football Group. On 12 November 2022, after winning the 2022 Apertura with the club, he left.

Career statistics

Club

International

Managerial statistics

Honours

Player

Club
São Paulo
 Copa Libertadores: 1992
 Campeonato Brasileiro Série A: 1991
 Campeonato Paulista: 1991, 1992
 Ramón de Carranza Trophy: 1992
 Teresa Herrera Trophy: 1992

Palmeiras
 Campeonato Brasileiro Série A: 1993, 1994
 Campeonato Paulista: 1993, 1994
 Torneio Rio – São Paulo: 1993

Corinthians
 Campeonato Paulista: 1997

Roma
 Serie A: 2000–01
 Supercoppa Italiana: 2001

Beşiktaş
 Süper Lig: 2002–03

Santos
 Campeonato Brasileiro Série A: 2004
 Campeonato Paulista: 2007

International
 Brazil
 Copa América: 1999

Manager
 Internacional
 Recopa Gaúcha: 2017

 Bragantino
 Campeonato Brasileiro Série B: 2019

 Bolívar
 Bolivian Primera División: 2022 Apertura

Individual
Campeonato Paulista Team of the Year: 2019

References

External links
 
 
 
 

1969 births
Living people
People from Presidente Prudente, São Paulo
Brazilian footballers
Brazilian football managers
Brazil international footballers
Brazilian expatriate footballers
Association football defenders
Expatriate footballers in Spain
Expatriate footballers in Japan
Expatriate footballers in Italy
Brazilian expatriate sportspeople in Turkey
Expatriate footballers in Turkey
1993 Copa América players
1999 Copa América players
Copa América-winning players
Campeonato Brasileiro Série A players
La Liga players
J1 League players
Serie A players
Süper Lig players
Campeonato Brasileiro Série A managers
Campeonato Brasileiro Série B managers
Campeonato Brasileiro Série C managers
São Paulo FC players
Albacete Balompié players
Sociedade Esportiva Palmeiras players
Kashiwa Reysol players
Sport Club Corinthians Paulista players
A.S. Roma players
Beşiktaş J.K. footballers
Esporte Clube Juventude players
Santos FC players
Associação Desportiva São Caetano managers
Sociedade Esportiva Palmeiras managers
Grêmio Barueri Futebol managers
Mogi Mirim Esporte Clube managers
Vila Nova Futebol Clube managers
Grêmio Osasco Audax Esporte Clube managers
Esporte Clube Juventude managers
Sport Club Internacional managers
Fortaleza Esporte Clube managers
Red Bull Brasil managers
Clube Atlético Bragantino managers
J1 League managers
Kashima Antlers managers
Club Bolívar managers
Brazilian expatriate sportspeople in Spain
Brazilian expatriate sportspeople in Japan
Brazilian expatriate sportspeople in Italy
Brazilian expatriate sportspeople in Ukraine
Brazilian expatriate sportspeople in Bolivia
Footballers from São Paulo (state)